Aberfoyle Park  is a suburb in the City of Onkaparinga in the state of South Australia. It is located in the southern suburbs of Adelaide, approximately 20 km from the city centre. Aberfoyle Park has a shopping mall called "The Hub", several primary schools and a public high school, one of the biggest in the state.

Aberfoyle Park is served by the Adelaide Metro bus routes G20, G21 and G22, which connect the suburb to Adelaide's city centre.

History

In 1845, Christian Sauerbier, from Germany, purchased land south of Adelaide, near Happy Valley. In 1856, Sauerbier owned eleven sections of land in the area. The area became agricultural and the Sauerbier family was renowned for the quality of their stud stock and the orange grove that was attached to their property. Christian Sauerbier died in 1893 and the property was given to his son, John Chris. During the First World War, when anti-German sentiment was at a high in Australia, Chris changed his last name to Aberfoyle – a potential reference to the Scottish village of Aberfoyle where his father had previously lived. John Chris died in 1923 and his estate was subdivided and sold by James Henry Browne.

Agriculture was the core of the districts economy for quite some time. Inevitably, the farmlands were turned into suburban expansion and the suburb of Aberfoyle Park was proclaimed on 10 July 1980. The Aberfoyle Park Post Office opened on 16 November 1981.

Geography
The suburb is located in the Adelaide Hills, giving the area a hilly terrain. Parks located in the suburb include Thalassa Park.

Governance
Aberfoyle Park is part of the City of Onkaparinga. It is in the South Australian House of Assembly (state) electoral district of Davenport, whose current member is Steve Murray, and the Australian House of Representatives (federal) Division of Kingston, whose representative is Amanda Rishworth.

Education
 The Aberfoyle Park Primary School Campus consists of 3 primary schools - State School 'Thiele', Catholic Education school 'Nativity', and the Uniting Church school 'Pilgrim' and Preschool all on the same grounds. There is a strong vision and spirit of cooperation and collaboration between the three schools.
 Aberfoyle Hub Primary School is a public R-7 school. It is notable for its success in the Pedal prix. The school's team, "The Hubcaps", have multiple consecutive wins in the Junior category of the race.
 Aberfoyle Park High School is one of the largest secondary schools in South Australia. It is a public high school for Year 7-12 students.

Sport
The Happy Valley sports park, which is located near Aberfoyle Park High School, contains the Happy Valley Football Club who are known as the Vikings, the Happy Valley Cricket Club, the Happy Valley Tennis Club, a lawn bowls club, a BMX club with a track and the Aberfoyle Park Scout group.

The Aberfoyle Park hub has a YMCA, which runs many community events such as volleyball.

Media
Aberfoyle Park has a local FM radio station, Easy FM 88, playing a mixture of Country, Easy Listening and Nostalgia.

References

External links
Aberfoyle Park - European History and Heritage - City of Onkaparinga

Suburbs of Adelaide
Populated places established in 1924